William David Lynch (15 February 1892 – 9 November 1947) was an Australian rules footballer who played with Richmond in the Victorian Football League (VFL).

Notes

External links 

1892 births
1947 deaths
Australian rules footballers from Victoria (Australia)
Richmond Football Club players